T. Janakiraman (also known as Thi Jaa, 28 June 1921 – 18 November 1982) is a Tamil writer from Tamil Nadu, India. He is one of the major figures of 20th century Tamil fiction.

Early life
He was born in a Tamil Brahmin (Iyer) family of Madras Presidency in 1921. He worked as a civil servant. His writing included accounts of his travels in Japan and the Crimea.

Career
His best-known novels are Mogamul, Sembaruthi, and Amma Vandhaal. These novels have feminine feelings embedded in their subjects. Though the story is spun around delicate feelings. His short stories such as "Langdadevi" (a lame horse) and "Mulmudi" (Crown of Thorns) follow the same style.

Bibliography
Thi Jaa wrote about one hundred short stories and a dozen novels. His most noted work is the novel Mogamul (Thorn of Desire). His other novels Amma Vandhaal and Marappasu were translated into English as "Sins of Appu's Mother" and "Wooden Cow" respectively. He was noted for his short stories. In 1979, he was awarded the Sahitya Akademi Award for Tamil for his short story collection Sakthi Vaidhiyam. Some of his other notable works are Malar Manjam, Uyirthen and Semparuthy.

Novels 
 Amirtham
 Malar Manjam
 Mogamul
 Anbe Aaramudhe
 Amma Vandhaal
 Uyirthen
 Semparuthi
 Marappasu
 Nalabaagam

Novellas 
 Adi
 Sivagnanam
 Kamalam
 Naalavathu sir
 Avalum umiyum
 Thodu 
 Veedu

Short story collections 
 Kottumelam
 Sivappu Rickshaw
 Akbar Shastri
 Yaadhum Oore
 Pidi Karunai
 Sakthi Vaithiyam
 Manidhabimaanam
 Erumai Pongal
 Aboorva Manidhargal
 Vendam indha Poosanikkai
Godavari Gundu

Translations 
 Annai
 Kullan

Plays 
 Doctorukku Marundhu
 Naalu Veli Nilam
 Vadivelu Vaathiyaar

Travelogues 
 Udhaya Sooriyan - Travelouge about Japan
 Nadandhaai Vaazhi Kaveri
 Adutha Veedu Aimbadhu Mile
 Karunkadalum Kalaikkadalum
 Nalapakam

References

1921 births
1982 deaths
Writers from Tamil Nadu
Tamil-language writers
Tamil writers
Recipients of the Sahitya Akademi Award in Tamil
20th-century Indian dramatists and playwrights
Indian travel writers
20th-century Indian translators
20th-century Indian short story writers
20th-century Indian novelists
Indian Tamil people